The 1937 Kansas State Wildcats football team represented Kansas State University in the 1937 college football season.  The team's head football coach was Wesley Fry, in his third year at the helm of the Wildcats. The Wildcats played their home games in Memorial Stadium.

Led by All-Conference back Elmer Hackney, Kansas State led the Big Six Conference in rushing offense and total offense in 1937.  Nevertheless, the team finished the season with a 4–5 record and a 1–4 record in conference play, in a tie for last place.  Despite a potent rushing game, the Wildcats scored only 76 points and gave up 84 points.

Schedule

References

Kansas State
Kansas State Wildcats football seasons
Kansas State Wildcats football